Kim Ogg is an American lawyer. She is the Harris County District Attorney in Texas and assumed office in 2017. Her current term ends on December 31, 2024. She was previously the City of Houston’s first appointed Anti-Gang Task Force Director, and the executive director of Crime Stoppers of Houston. She is a member of the Democratic Party.

Early career 
Ogg began her legal career working for a District Attorney Johnny Holmes in 1987. She was appointed as the first director for Houston's Anti-Gang Task Force in 1994 and unsuccessfully ran for district judge as a Republican in the 1996 election. Ogg was the executive director of Crime Stoppers of Houston from 1999 to 2006 before leaving to practice law with her father.

Harris County District Attorney 
Kim Ogg ran on a moderate Democratic platform against Republican incumbent Devon Anderson, using her inauguration ceremony to announce that all misdemeanor marijuana cases would be diverted from arrest or prosecution.

Her programs have helped more than 6,000 people with mental illness to get the help they need rather than a jail cell as part of an effort  program to end cycles of arrest. She also received the Lone Star Award in December 2021 for her "outstanding leadership and distinctive contributions" to substance abuse and recovery support.

During her tenure, dismissal rates have increased greatly with approximately half of felony cases ending in dismissal and over 70% of misdemeanor cases. Her staff suggest this may be a sign of successful pretrial diversion programs. Other criminal attorneys and advocates argue this may be due to aggressive prosecution and poor selection of cases, worsening the case backlog in the Harris County courts.

Reform Approach to Capital Punishment 
Her Office has fought to ensure that no one who is found by a court to be Intellectually Disabled faces execution. She has brought a reform mentality to a punishment that she says constitutes the most serious action a government should take and as it is permitted under Texas law should be reserved for the worst of the worst.

Marijuana Reform 
In an effort to see that public safety resources are used to actually keep the public safer, Kim Ogg in early 2017 initiated a program that took a new approach: no one caught with under four ounces of marijuana, a misdemeanor amount, is subjected to arrest and the possibility of a criminal record. The program has given people the ability to avoid a criminal record and still be eligible for a job, an apartment or federal financial assistance.  In 2022, she spoke in support of arrests for marijuana possession in cases where it coincides with gun possession, because it is illegal in Texas to carry a gun while in possession of marijuana. This has resulted in "dozens of cases being dismissed every month" because Ogg's prosecutors are unable to prove that people being arrested are carrying marijuana, which is illegal in Texas, rather than hemp, which is legal.

Independent Review of Police Shootings 
Kim Ogg has required that every instance in which a police officer shoots a civilian that the shooting be independently reviewed by prosecutors and that each case be presented to a grand jury to determine whether criminal charges are warranted. Civil Rights Division prosecutors handle the cases and go to the scene of each and every shooting. She has said that this is done to ensure that the community determines whether an indictment is warranted, and thus the officer is prosecuted, or the shooting be declared legal and thus, the officer cleared.

Harding Street Raid 
Several Houston Police officers were charged with crimes, including one for murder, after two innocent Houston residents, Dennis Tuttle and his wife Rhogena Nicholas, were shot to death by police in their home. Some defense lawyers criticized the way Ogg's office handled the Harding Street Raid fallout. Prosecutors asked a judge to make a determination on what material to release to defense lawyers. While many drug arrest cases, based on the work of those police officers, have been dismissed, Ogg's office has chosen to keep nearly all of the property seized from those defendants. After the raid, advocacy organizations called for Ogg to publish a "no call" list that her office maintains of police officers seen as unreliable potential witnesses due to behavior such as "lying, falsifying evidence, or making racist or violent statements." Her office has refused to release both the list and the number of police officers on the list.

Campaign contributions controversy 
Houston Watch, which generates politically-driven information targeting certain officials and is funded by interests outside of Harris County, focuses nearly exclusively on Ogg. It reported that she accepted over $25,000 of campaign contributions from Ali Davari, who owns strip clubs. In July 2019, Ogg's office dismissed the criminal charges against an alleged local gambling ring and referred the case by former contract employee Amir Mireskandari to the FBI. Mireskandari and his wife contributed $14,475 in monetary and in-kind donations to Ogg's campaign between 2016 and 2017. He was also a member of Ogg's campaign finance committee.

Bail Reform 
Harris County in 2019 enacted reforms that were intended to end the use of cash bail for misdemeanor defendants after a federal judge found the county's bail system to be unconstitutional and a violation of the Fourteenth Amendment. During Ogg's tenure as district attorney, she has been a strong critic of bail reform and the perceived leniency of judges toward people accused of crimes. This stance has placed her in alignment with Republican county commissioners and in opposition to many local Democrats such as Harris County Judge Lina Hidalgo. Her office has provided statistics which they claim demonstrates an increase in people charged with violent crimes who are being released from jail due to low bond amounts and then going on to commit more crimes. These claims have not been independently verified. An independent monitor appointed by the court found that misdemeanor bail reform has been successful in reducing misdemeanor arrests and reducing wasteful county spending.

Personal life 
Born in 1959 in Houston, Ogg attended the University of Texas at Austin and South Texas College of Law Houston, graduating with her BA in journalism in 1981 and her JD in 1986 respectively. She and her longtime partner met while studying at South Texas College of Law, and they have one son who attends The University of Texas
School of Law. She is the daughter of Texas legislator and Democrat Jack Ogg, and philanthropist Connie Harner Ogg.

References 

1959 births
County district attorneys in Texas
Living people
South Texas College of Law alumni
Texas politicians
University of Texas at Austin alumni
Lawyers from Houston